Karl Jon Best (born March 6, 1959) is an American former professional baseball relief pitcher. He played for the Seattle Mariners and Minnesota Twins of Major League Baseball (MLB).

Career
Karl Best was born in Aberdeen, Washington and graduated from Kent-Meridian High School in Kent, Washington

Best was drafted by the Mariners in the 12th round of the 1977 MLB draft.

Best made his MLB debut on August 19, 1983, with the Mariners. He traded to the Detroit Tigers for Bryan Kelly in June  while inactive, then was sent to the Twins in exchange for Don Schulze just before the 1988 season began. Two months after appearing in what would be his final major league game, he was traded to the San Francisco Giants in August 1988 for Alan Cockrell but never pitched an inning for them.

References

External links
, or Retrosheet
Pura Pelota (Venezuelan Winter League)

1959 births
Living people
Alexandria Mariners players
American expatriate baseball players in Canada
Baseball players from Washington (state)
Bellingham Mariners players
Calgary Cannons players
Lynn Sailors players
Major League Baseball pitchers
Minnesota Twins players
People from Aberdeen, Washington
Phoenix Firebirds players
Portland Beavers players
Salt Lake City Gulls players
Seattle Mariners players
Stockton Mariners players
Tiburones de La Guaira players
American expatriate baseball players in Venezuela
Toledo Mud Hens players